Edmar Bernardes dos Santos (born 20 January 1960 in Araxá, Brazil), or simply Edmar, is a Brazilian former footballer who played as a forward. He won the silver medal at the 1988 Summer Olympics with Brazil.

Honours

Individual
 Brazilian Championship Top Scorer: 1985
 São Paulo State Championship Top Scorer: 1980, 1987

External links
 
 
 
 
 

1960 births
Living people
Brazilian footballers
Brazil international footballers
Olympic footballers of Brazil
Olympic silver medalists for Brazil
Footballers at the 1988 Summer Olympics
Brazilian expatriate footballers
Cruzeiro Esporte Clube players
Esporte Clube Taubaté players
Grêmio Foot-Ball Porto Alegrense players
CR Flamengo footballers
Guarani FC players
Sport Club Corinthians Paulista players
Delfino Pescara 1936 players
Clube Atlético Mineiro players
Santos FC players
Rio Branco Esporte Clube players
Vegalta Sendai players
Campeonato Brasileiro Série A players
Serie A players
Serie B players
Expatriate footballers in Italy
Expatriate footballers in Japan
Olympic medalists in football
Sport Club Barueri players
Medalists at the 1988 Summer Olympics
Association football forwards